Saltimbanco was a Cirque du Soleil show which ran from 1992 to 2006 in its original form.

Saltimbanco may also refer to:

Les saltimbanques 1899 comic opera by Louis Ganne
Les Saltimbanques (Dumersan), an 1838 farce désopilante by Théophile Marion Dumersan
La famille de saltimbanques, 1905 painting by Pablo Picasso
"The Saltimbanques," a 2001 short horror story by Terry Dowling

See also
Acrobat